Zealanapis australis is a spider species in the genus Zealanapis found in New Zealand.

See also
 List of Anapidae species

References

External links

Anapidae
Spiders of New Zealand
Spiders described in 1951